Lysandra apennina is a butterfly in the family Lycaenidae. It was described by Philipp Christoph Zeller in 1847. It is found in Italy. It is often regarded as a subspecies of Lysandra coridon. It is on the whole paler than coridon, the dark marginal border of the forewing being lighter in consequence of an intermixture of the ground-colour.

References

Butterflies described in 1847
Lysandra (butterfly)
Butterflies of Europe